Jean Bobet (22 February 1930 – 27 July 2022) was a French road bicycle racer. He was the younger brother of Louison Bobet. Less successful, he nevertheless won the world students' championship as an amateur and then, as a professional, Paris–Nice in 1955, Genoa–Nice in 1956 and the Circuit du Morbihan in 1953. He came third in Milan–San Remo in 1953. He rode from 1949 to 1959, including all three Grand Tours.

He and his brother retired from racing after a car carrying them crashed outside Paris in the autumn of 1960. Louison went into business ventures and Jean became a journalist. He became head of sport at Radio Luxembourg, wrote for L'Équipe and then Le Monde. He made occasional contributions to Miroir du Cyclisme and still (2008) appears on television, notably in retrospective programmes. He was instrumental in forming a museum in his brother's memory in Saint-Méen-le-Grand.

He wrote several books, including Louison Bobet, une vélobiographie (Éditions Gallimard, 1958), an account of life with his brother in Demain on roule (Editions de la Table Ronde, 2004), translated as Tomorrow We Ride (Mousehold Press, 2008), and a history of Octave Lapize, one of the first stars of the Tour de France: Lapize, celui-là était un 'as' (Editions de la Table Ronde, 2003), translated as Lapize ... now there was an ace (Mousehold Press, 2010).

Teams
1949–1951 Stella-Dunlop
1952 Stella-Huret
1953 Bottecchia and Stella-Wolber-Dunlop
1954 Stella-Wolber-Dunlop
1955 L. Bobet-BP-Hutchinson and Mercier-Hutchinson
1956 L. Bobet-BP-Hutchinson
1957 L. Bobet-BP-Hutchinson, Mercier-BP-Hutchinson and Velo Club Bustese
1958–1959 L. Bobet-BP-Hutchinson

Achievements 

1949
 World University Cycling Champion
 World student team time-trial champion
1950
 World University Cycling Champion
1951
 1st Tour de l'Orne
 1st Lannion–Rennes
 1st Circuit de la Vallée de Loire
1952
 1st Dinan
 1st Hautmont
1953
 1st Circuit de Morbihan
 1st Grand Prix d'Europe
1955
 1st Paris–Nice and one stage win
 1st Scaer
1956
 1st Genoa–Nice
1959
 1st Lodève

Tour de France
1955 14th
1957 15th

Giro d'Italia
1953 Did not finish
1957 25th
1958 Did not finish (11th stage)

Vuelta a España
1956 Did not finish (16th stage)

References

External links

1930 births
2022 deaths
French male cyclists
Cycling journalists
Cycling writers
French sports journalists
Sportspeople from Ille-et-Vilaine
French male non-fiction writers
Cyclists from Brittany